Lukas Müller (born 14 March 1992) is an Austrian former ski jumper who competed from 2007 to 2016.

Biography
He won the normal hill competition at the 2009 Junior Ski Jumping World Championships. In 2016 he reached a peak position of fifth in the men's Continental Cup standings.

His career was cut short after a violent crash during a training round at the Kulm ski flying hill on 13 January 2016. He suffered serious spinal injuries and an incomplete paralysis of the legs, and later underwent surgery for his lower spine.

Accomplishments
Winner of the FIS Junior Ski Jumping World Championships in Strbske Pleso on 2–8 February 2009
Winner of both days of the COC competition in Iron Mountain on 14–15 February 2009

References

External links

Austrian male ski jumpers
1992 births
Living people
Competitors at the 2015 Winter Universiade
21st-century Austrian people